Wildwood Lake is a reservoir in Jefferson County, in the U.S. state of Missouri.

References

Reservoirs in Missouri
Bodies of water of Jefferson County, Missouri
Dams in Missouri
United States Army Corps of Engineers dams